Roberto Ferrari (born 24 March 1967) is a retired Italian high jumper.

Biography
He was born in Cremona. He became Italian high jump champion in 1992 and 1994, rivalling with Fabrizio Borellini and Ettore Ceresoli. He also became indoor champion in 1993. He competed at the 1993 World Indoor Championships, the 1993 World Championships, the 1994 European Indoor Championships and the 1994 European Championships without reaching the final.

His personal best jump is 2.30 metres, achieved in June 1993 in Rome.

National titles
Roberto Ferrari has won 3 times the individual national championship.
2 wins in high jump (1992, 1994)
1 win in high jump indoor (1993)

See also
Italian all-time top lists - High jump

References

External links
 

Italian male high jumpers
1967 births
Living people
Sportspeople from Cremona
World Athletics Championships athletes for Italy
20th-century Italian people
21st-century Italian people